The Devil's Own is a 1997 American action thriller film starring Harrison Ford and Brad Pitt, with Rubén Blades, Natascha McElhone, Julia Stiles, Margaret Colin, and Treat Williams in supporting roles. It was the final film directed by Alan J. Pakula, who died the next year, and the final film photographed by Gordon Willis, who retired soon after. The film was written by Vincent Patrick, David Aaron Cohen, and Kevin Jarre. The plot revolves around a member of the Provisional Irish Republican Army (Pitt) who comes to the United States to obtain black market anti-aircraft missiles to shoot down British helicopters in Northern Ireland. The plan is complicated by an Irish-American policeman (Ford), whom the IRA member has come to regard as family.

Plot

During the year 1972, eight-year-old Frankie McGuire witnesses a masked man shoot his father dead for Irish republican sympathies. Twenty years later in Belfast, Frankie and three other IRA members engage in a shootout with the British Army and undercover agents from the Special Reconnaissance Unit. One gunman is killed and another, Desmond, is mortally wounded; Frankie and his close friend Sean Phelan flee. Frankie's commander Martin MacDuff, seeing a British Army helicopter circling above, decides that the IRA needs Stinger missiles to fight back.

Frankie soon travels to New York City with an alias of "Rory Devaney" to buy these missiles. American Judge Peter Fitzsimmons, a longtime supporter of the IRA, provides him with a temporary job as a construction worker and arranges for him to stay with NYPD Sergeant Tom O'Meara, his wife Sheila, and their three daughters on Staten Island. Thinking that "Rory" is an Irish immigrant who needs a place to live while he finds work, the O'Meara family warmly welcome Frankie into their household and he soon becomes a trusted member of the family.

Meanwhile, Sean also arrives in New York City and meets up with Frankie. Before long, Sean acquires an old fishing boat for him and Frankie to smuggle the missiles. Frankie meets with black market arms dealer and Irish mobster Billy Burke, and they cut a deal to exchange the missiles for payment in six to eight weeks. Judge Fitzsimmons obtains the money from his usual connections and has Megan Doherty, another IRA operative posing as his family's nanny, deliver it to Frankie. Megan later calls Frankie to warn him that MacDuff was killed by British authorities and that they must postpone the deal.

Meanwhile, Tom's partner, Eddie Diaz, fatally shoots an unarmed thief in the back as he runs away. Torn between his duty to protect his partner and his moral obligation to tell the truth, Tom decides to retire from the force. After a meal where Tom tells Sheila about his decision, the two of them drive home only to be confronted by masked intruders. As Tom fights the intruders, Sheila rushes to call 911. Just then, Frankie arrives and tries to help Tom, but the intruders have guns and force Frankie and Tom to stop resisting. As police sirens approach, the intruders decide to leave the men and make their escape.

Frankie leaves and proceeds to a bar that Burke owns. He confronts Burke for ordering the attack and shoots one of his men in the knee. Burke is uncowed and demands that Frankie pay him for the missiles, revealing that he has Sean as a hostage. Realizing he has no choice, Frankie returns to the O'Meara house, where he hid the money that he got from Megan.

While Frankie is away meeting with Burke, Tom has gone down to the basement where Frankie had been staying. Seeing that the couch pillows had been sliced, Tom realizes that the masked intruders must have been looking for something related to Frankie. As he walks around the basement, he accidentally discovers an empty space under the bathroom floorboards. When he checks it, he discovers a duffel bag containing wads of cash.

When Frankie returns, he is confronted by Tom with the money. Frankie decides to reveal his true identity and ask Tom to give him the money and let him leave. Tom refuses and, when Eddie arrives, the two of them arrest Frankie. En route to the police station, they get stuck in a traffic jam. While Eddie goes to talk to a driver of a stalled vehicle, Frankie slips his cuffed arms over his legs, grabs Tom's gun, and jumps out of the car. Eddie tries to shoot him and Frankie is forced to shoot Eddie in self-defense. This altercation gives Tom enough time to clamber out of the car and break off the key in the trunk lock, preventing Frankie from getting the duffel bag of money. Frankie runs off.

After Eddie's death, Tom meets with the FBI and their British counterparts, who ask him questions about Frankie. Tom realizes that the government agents intend to not just find and arrest Frankie, but to kill him.

Frankie arrives at the warehouse where Burke said they would do the exchange. Burke and his henchmen are waiting for Frankie, who walks nonchalantly, his duffel bag swung over his shoulder. One of the henchmen pats Frankie down and confirms that he is unarmed. Frankie asks Burke if he has the weapons and Burke shows him a bunch of boxes containing missiles. Then Burke has another henchman pull something out of the trunk and toss it at Frankie's feet. With horror, Frankie realizes that it is Sean's severed head. With guns pointed at him, Frankie releases the duffel bag, which Burke assumes contains the money. Instead, it contains a bomb rigged to the zipper. When the bomb goes off, Frankie uses the confusion to grab one of the henchmen's guns and use his military skills to kill Burke and his henchmen. He then jumps in the van containing the missiles and drives off.

At the Fitzsimmons' residence, Frankie has Megan alert his comrades in Ireland that he will be leaving right away to deliver the missiles. While Frankie is upstairs with Megan, Tom crashes the Fitzsimmons' cocktail party and confronts the judge. He then recognizes Megan from a photo in Frankie's bag. Tom runs after Megan upstairs just in time to see Frankie escaping onto the roof. Tom persuades Megan to reveal where Frankie is going by convincing her that the authorities are trying to kill Frankie and he is the only one who can save Frankie's life.

Pulling up to the boat dock out of Frankie's line of sight, Tom sneaks up as Frankie gets the boat ready to sail. Jumping onto the boat as it leaves the dock, Tom has a final standoff with Frankie. The two men shoot at each other through the glass of the bridge. Tom falls down, wounded, and looks up as Frankie steps out onto the deck. Frankie points his gun at Tom but then his hand begins to shake. Realizing that he too has been shot, Frankie drops the gun and collapses onto the deck. Tom pulls himself close to Frankie and they embrace each other, recognizing that both were fighting for causes they believe in. Frankie dies, and Tom, though badly wounded, steers the boat back to shore.

Cast

Production
The film's origins date back to the 1980s, it began as a pitch by producers Lawrence Gordon and Robert F. Colesberry, the producers hired screenwriter Kevin Jarre to write the first draft, as Gordon recalled "Jarre had disappeared for a couple of years and came back with a wonderful screenplay". Gordon acquired the script in 1990. In 1991, Gordon took the script to Brad Pitt, who was not yet well-known at the time, Pitt enthusiastically accepted the script, which Gordon recalled "was supposed to be a gritty, low-budget thriller with Brad as the only star", the project began moving forward towards pre-production, however the project was left at a standstill due to Pitt's none too impressive acting credits at the time, as well as the politically controversial subject matter on which the story was based. In the ensuing years interest in the project was renewed thanks to Pitt's performances in Legends of the Fall, Interview with the Vampire, and 12 Monkeys, but the studio was of the opinion that Pitt could not carry a major film alone. Pitt visited Belfast in preparation for the role and suffered bruises after he was attacked on the city's Falls Road after being mistaken for a protestant.

For the role of Tom O'Meara, both Gene Hackman and Sean Connery had been considered at various points, but at Pitt's suggestion, Harrison Ford was approached for the role, which at that time was more of a character role. Ford agreed, though that meant the script had to be rewritten to create a fuller role for Ford and a more complicated relationship between the characters played by the two men. To expand Ford's role, producers brought in David Aaron Cohen and Vincent Patrick to rewrite Jarre's script, as Patrick stated "There was no way they were going to shoot the original script. It had to become a two-hero piece with equal action heroes. Supporting two stars is what this was about" It was Ford's suggestion to bring Pakula in as director. Principal photography started in February 1996, with the script "still in flux"; according to The New York Times, "ego clashes, budget overruns and long delays plagued the project." Pitt "threatened to quit early in the shoot, complaining that the script was incomplete and incoherent" and later "denounced the movie as 'the most irresponsible bit of film making – if you can even call it that – that I've ever seen.'" The producers hired screenwriter Terry George to help further develop Pitt's character. In March 1996, Pakula hired screenwriter Robert Mark Kamen to provide rewrites during production, Kamen noted the difficulties on set as he recalled "They were running out of script to shoot. They had a script that wasn't acceptable to either actor, Alan [Pakula] didn't start with a script that everyone had signed off on, we were flying blind....It was scary". Kamen met with both Ford and Pitt to discuss their ideas about improving the script, contrary to the rumors, Kamen insisted that both actors were agreeable to each other, "It wasn't the tension between them that made things tense. It was the tension each had with their own parts."

According to Pakula, one problem was that the film's plot did not fall along conventionally simple Hollywood lines, as Ford and Pitt were both playing "good guys" according to each of their own distinct moral codes. The New York Times characterized Ford's character as "the upright American cop who deplores violence" and Pitt's as "an I.R.A. gunman for whom violence is a reasonable solution to his people's 300 years of troubles." Pakula compared his intent with the two characters to that depicted in Red River, a 1948 western in which John Wayne's character is defied by his young protégé, played by Montgomery Clift.

The Devil's Own was filmed on location and at the Chelsea Piers studios in New York City, as well as in Newark, Hoboken, Jersey City, Bayonne, Sandy Hook and Montclair, New Jersey.  and Greenport, New York on Long Island.  The opening scenes were filmed at Port Oriel, Clogherhead, County Louth, Republic of Ireland. The Belfast shootout scenes were filmed in Inchicore, Dublin in July 1996. Other location shoots in Ireland were in the Dublin Mountains. Two months before it opened, the film was still unfinished:  Pakula was unhappy with the final scene ("a showdown on a boat with a cargo of Stinger missiles"), so in early February the scene was "rewritten and reshot over two days in a studio in California."

Reception
The Devil's Own received mixed reviews from critics. On Metacritic it has a score of 53/100, based on reviews from 26 critics. Audiences polled by CinemaScore gave the film an average grade of "B-" on an A+ to F scale.

In retrospect, Brad Pitt said: "I really like Devil's Own. It was a good schooling for me. Still, I think the movie could have been better. Literally, the script got thrown out."

Harrison Ford is also very fond of the movie: "We had a real hard time making it, but Alan [Pakula] made, I think, a really good movie out of it."

Roger Ebert gave the film 2½ stars out of 4, saying it showed "ignorance of the history of Northern Ireland" and that "the issues involved between the two sides are never mentioned." The review criticised the contrived plot, stating "The moral reasoning in the film is so confusing that only by completely sidestepping it can the plot work at all." Pitt and Ford were praised, with Ebert complimenting the pair, describing them as "enormously appealing and gifted actors, and to the degree that the movie works, it's because of them."

James Berardinelli gave the film 2½ stars out of 4, saying:

Janet Maslin called it an "unexpectedly solid thriller" with a "first-rate, madly photogenic performance" by Pitt; she notes that it is "directed by Alan J. Pakula in a thoughtful urban style that recalls the vintage New York stories of Sidney Lumet" and "handsomely photographed by Gordon Willis". Richard Schickel called it "quite a good movie – a character-driven (as opposed to whammy-driven) suspense drama – dark, fatalistic and, within its melodramatically stretched terms, emotionally plausible"; he said Pakula "develops his story patiently, without letting its tensions unravel." Entertainment Weekly gave it a "B+," calling it a "quiet, absorbing, shades-of-gray drama, a kind of thriller meditation on the schism in Northern Ireland."

A reviewer for Salon.com called it "a disjointed, sluggish picture" with a problematic script that "bears the marks of tinkering": "swatches of the story appear to be missing, relationships aren't clearly defined, and characters aren't identified." 
Variety said: 

The film grossed $140 million, exceeding its $90 million budget, of which $43 million was from North America.

The film was involved in adverse publicity when, two months before her death, Diana, Princess of Wales took 15-year-old Prince William, and 12-year-old Prince Harry, to see the movie. The movie was restricted to movie-goers aged 15 or older, and the Princess persuaded the cinema to let Prince Harry stay despite him being three years underage. She was criticised for flouting the law, for using her influence to persuade the cinema's employees to flout the law, and because of the movie's subject matter (which was said to glamorise the IRA – highly sensitive given that her sons' great-uncle Earl Mountbatten was assassinated by the IRA). She later apologised, saying she had been unaware of the film's content.

References

External links

 
 
 
 
 

1997 films
1997 action thriller films
1997 crime thriller films
American action thriller films
American crime thriller films
American thriller drama films
American chase films
Columbia Pictures films
1990s English-language films
Films scored by James Horner
Films about families
Films about terrorism in Europe
Films about the Irish Republican Army
Films about The Troubles (Northern Ireland)
Films directed by Alan J. Pakula
Films set in 1972
Films set in 1992
Films set in 1993
Films shot in New Jersey
Films set in New York City
Films set in Northern Ireland
Films shot in the Republic of Ireland
American police detective films
1990s American films